The Reserve Infantry Division of Xinjiang Military District() is a reserve infantry formation of the People's Liberation Army.

On July 17, 1983, the formation of a reserve infantry unit began in Shihezi Military Sub-district according to Order No.787 of the Urumqi Military Region.

The Reserve Division of Shihezi was formally activated on May 1, 1984. The division was then composed of:
1st Regiment
2nd Regiment
3rd Regiment
Artillery Regiment

In December 1985, Shihezi Military Sub-district was disbanded. The division was then redesignated as the Reserve Infantry Division of Xinjiang Military District and was put under now Xinjiang Military District's control. From 1987 the division maintained as fully manned and equipped.

On August 28, 2005, Anti-Aircraft Artillery Regiment, Reserve Infantry Division of Xinjiang Military District was activated. 

Since then the division was composed of:
1st Regiment - Changji, Xinjiang
2nd Regiment - Shihezi, Xinjiang
3rd Regiment - Kuitun, Xinjiang
Artillery Regiment - Shihezi, Xinjiang
Anti-Aircraft Artillery Regiment - Urumqi, Xinjiang.

References

Reserve divisions of the People's Liberation Army
Military units and formations established in 1984